Odem High School is a public high school located in the city of Odem, Texas, in San Patricio County, United States and classified as a 3A school by the UIL. It is a part of the Odem Independent School District located in east central San Patricio County. In 2015, the school was rated "Met Standard" by the Texas Education Agency.

References

External links
 

Public high schools in Texas
Schools in San Patricio County, Texas
Corpus Christi metropolitan area